Liceum Ogolnoksztalcace imienia K.E.N. is a high school founded in September 1938 and located at n. 5 of Staszica Street in Stalowa Wola, Poland.

Schools in Poland